Lavangen is a municipality in Troms og Finnmark county, Norway. The administrative centre of the municipality is the village of Tennevoll. Other villages in Lavangen include Fossbakken and Spansdalen (in the inland areas) and Kjeiprød, Røkenes, Låternes, Tennevoll, Hesjevika, Soløy, and Å (surrounding the fjord).

The  municipality is the 266th largest by area out of the 356 municipalities in Norway. Lavangen is the 334th most populous municipality in Norway with a population of 970.

General information
Lavangen was established on 1 January 1907 when it was separated from Ibestad Municipality. The initial population was 1,536. During the 1960s, there were many municipal mergers across Norway due to the work of the Schei Committee. On 1 January 1964, the neighboring municipalities of Lavangen (population: 1,677) and Salangen (population: 2,611) were merged into one large municipality of Salangen. The merger was brief, however, because on 1 January 1977, the old Lavangen municipality (except for the Lavangsnes area) was made a separate municipality once again.

On 1 January 2020, the municipality became part of the newly formed Troms og Finnmark county. Previously, it had been part of the old Troms county.

Name
The municipality is named after the local Lavangen fjord since it is a central geographical feature of the area.

Coat of arms
The coat of arms was granted on 18 December 1987. The official blazon is "Gules, three birch leaves Or in pall stems conjoined". This means the arms have a red field (background) and the charge is three birch leaves that are connected and in a Y-shape design. The leaves have a tincture of Or which means they are commonly colored yellow, but if it is made out of metal, then gold is used. The arms are a canting of the name of the municipality (which means leaf). The three leaves represent how the municipality was settled by Norwegians, Samis, and Kvens. The arms were designed by Øystein Hermod Skaugvolldal.

Churches
The Church of Norway has one parish within the municipality of Lavangen. It is part of the Indre Troms prosti (deanery) in the Diocese of Nord-Hålogaland.

Geography
The municipality encompasses the land around the Spansdalelva river valley and most of the area around the Lavangen fjord, south of the Astafjorden. The municipality borders Narvik (in Nordland county) to the south, Gratangen to the west, Salangen to the north, and Bardu to the east.

Climate

Government
All municipalities in Norway, including Lavangen, are responsible for primary education (through 10th grade), outpatient health services, senior citizen services, unemployment and other social services, zoning, economic development, and municipal roads. The municipality is governed by a municipal council of elected representatives, which in turn elect a mayor.  The municipality falls under the Ofoten District Court and the Hålogaland Court of Appeal.

Municipal council
The municipal council  of Lavangen is made up of 15 representatives that are elected to four year terms. The party breakdown of the council is as follows:

Mayors
The mayors of Lavangen (incomplete list):

1907–1913: Bernhard Dahl Karlsen
1926–1937: Lorentz K. Brattberg Aa (Ap)
1938–1942: Johan Sandmel 
1942–1945: Albert Olaus Dahl 
1948–1959: Alfred Ottesen (Ap)
(Part of Salangen Municipality from 1964–1977)
1983–2003: Torleif Myrseth (Ap)
2003–2007: Bernhardt Halvorsen (Sp)
2007–2011: Viktor Andberg (Ap)
2011–2015: Erling Bratsberg (Sp)
2015–2019: Bernhardt Halvorsen (Sp)
2019–present: Hege Beathe Myrseth Rollmoen (Sp)

Attractions
Spanstind rundt is a famous cross-country skiing race in Lavangen that is held on Maundy Thursdays each year.

Notable people 
 Cecilie Myrseth (born 1984) a Norwegian psychologist and politician, grew up in Lavangen
 Sandra Borch (born 1988 in Lavangen) a Norwegian politician

References

External links
Municipal fact sheet from Statistics Norway 

 
Municipalities of Troms og Finnmark
1907 establishments in Norway
1964 disestablishments in Norway
1977 establishments in Norway